Imaginations Through the Looking Glass is the first video album by German power metal band Blind Guardian.

The band intended to record a DVD since early 1998, however, due to the band's high requirements, no existing metal festival had been considered suitable. Instead, they decided to create their own festival, back in their homeland. The First Blind Guardian Festival was held in Coburg, Germany, on 16–17 June 2003; it lasted two days, with the band playing during both nights.

The entire show was professionally recorded and subsequently released on DVD on 14 June 2004. The cover art was painted by Leo Hao.

Content
The show had been very well prepared for the recording, with complex lighting and pyrotechnic effects set up to assist the musicians in creating the atmosphere. Blind Guardian's performance is generally considered excellent, and the degree of the audience's involvement was surprising even to the band members themselves. This is especially visible when the crowd continued to sing the chorus of "Valhalla" after the song was well over, stopping to cheer, and then starting to sing again, joined by an impromptu drum beat.

The setlist was partly based on a poll conducted on the band's website, which (combined with the amount of time the band had) led to a varied set with classics like "The Bard's Song (In the Forest)" but also some rarely played songs such as "Somewhere Far Beyond".

There are two (two-layer) DVDs in the release; the first one contains the show itself, with 20 tracks and approximately 125 minutes of running time. Disc 2 contains extra material, including an interview with the band and four bonus songs, recorded in previous tours. The set has a typical Blind Guardian fantasy-style artwork painted by Leo Hao, mixed with photos from the show, with several humorous elements included such as a picture of Legolas, Gimli and Gollum buying tickets for the concert.

Track listing

Disc 1

 War of Wrath
 Time Stands Still
 Banish from Sanctuary
 Nightfall
 The Script for My Requiem
 Valhalla
 A Past and Future Secret
 Punishment Divine
 Mordred's Song
 The Last Candle
 Bright Eyes
 Lord of the Rings
 I'm Alive
 Another Holy War
 And Then There Was Silence
 Somewhere Far Beyond
 The Bard's Song (In the Forest)
 Imaginations from the Other Side
 And the Story Ends
 Mirror Mirror

Disc 2

 Interview with Blind Guardian
 Slideshow
 The Making of The B.G. Festival Coburg 2003
 Bonus Songs:
 Majesty
 Into the Storm
 Welcome to Dying
 Lost in the Twilight Hall

Personnel
Hansi Kürsch – vocals
André Olbrich – guitars
Marcus Siepen – guitars
Thomen Stauch – drums
Oliver Holzwarth – bass (touring member)
Michael "Mi" Schüren – keyboards (touring member)

Blind Guardian video albums
Concert films
2004 video albums
2004 live albums
Live video albums